One ship of the Commonwealth of England has borne the name Speaker, and one Royal Navy ship has borne the name HMS Speaker:

 , a 50-gun  frigate launched in 1650, renamed HMS Mary in 1660, rebuilt in 1688 and wrecked in 1703.
 , a  launched in 1943 and sold for scrap in 1972.

Royal Navy ship names